The governor of Mykolaiv Oblast is the head of executive branch for the Mykolaiv Oblast.

The office of governor is an appointed position, with officeholders being appointed by the president of Ukraine, on recommendation from the prime minister of Ukraine, to serve a four-year term.

The official residence for the governor is located in Mykolaiv. The governor is Vitaliy Kim, who assumed office on 25 November 2020.

Governors

Chairman of Executive Committee of Mykolaiv Oblast
 Onyfriy Stolbun (1937–1938)
 Ivan Filippov (1938–1941)
 Nazi German occupational administration (1941–1943)
 Ivan Filippov (1943–1944)
 Panteleymon Borisov (1944–1947)
 Stepan Tereshchenko (1947–1949)
 Mykhailo Syvolap (1949–1953)
 Ivan Nazarenko (1953–1961) 
 Vasyl Vednikov (1961–1964)         
 Volodymyr Andrianov (1963–1964)
 Tymofiy Barylnyk (1964–1967)
 Mykola Kulish (1967–1975)
 Fedir Zayvy (1975–1982)
 Viktor Ilyin (1982–1989)
 Ivan Grytsay (1989–1990)
 Mykhailo Bashkirov (1990)
 Ivan Grytsay (1990–1992)

Representative of the President
 Anatoliy Kinakh (1992–1994)

Chairman of the Executive Committee
 Anatoliy Kinakh (1994–1995)

Heads of the Administration
 Mykola Kruhlov (1995–1997)
 Mykola Kruhlov (1997–1999)
 Oleksii Harkusha (1999–2005)
 Oleksandr Sadykov (2005–2007)
 Oleksii Harkusha (2007–2010)
 Mykola Kruhlov (2010–2014)
 Hennady Nikolenko (2014)
 Mykola Romanchuk (2014)
 Vadym Merikov (2014–2016)
 Oleksiy Savchenko (2016–2019)
 Viacheslav Bon (2019) (acting)
 Oleksandr Stadnik (2019–2020)
 Heorhiy Reshetilov (2020) (acting)
 Vitaliy Kim (2020, incumbent)

Notes

References

Sources
 World Statesmen.org

External links
Government of Mykolaiv Oblast in Ukrainian

 
Mykolaiv Oblast